José Rodríguez García (born 30 April 1966) is a Spanish former cyclist. He competed in the team time trial at the 1988 Summer Olympics.

Major results

1991
1st Overall Vuelta a Castilla y León
1st Stage 2
2nd Clásica Internacional de Alcobendas
2nd National Road Race Championships
1992
2nd Mémorial Manuel Galera
1993
1st Trofeo Masferrer
1994
3rd Overall Vuelta a Aragón
3rd Circuito de Getxo
1995
1st Stage 4 Vuelta a Burgos
1997
1st GP Llodio

References

1966 births
Living people
Spanish male cyclists
Olympic cyclists of Spain
Cyclists at the 1988 Summer Olympics
Cyclists from Madrid